Jean Lebeuf (7 March 1687 – 10 April 1760) was a French historian.

Biography
Lebeuf was born at Auxerre, where his father, a councillor in the parlement, was receveur des consignations. He began his studies in his native town, and continued them in Paris at the Collège Sainte-Barbe. He soon became known as one of the most cultivated minds of his time. He made himself master of practically every branch of medieval learning, and had a thorough knowledge of the sources and the bibliography of his subject. His learning was not drawn from books only; he was also an archaeologist, and frequently went on expeditions in France, always on foot, in the course of which he examined the monuments of architecture and sculpture, as well as the libraries, and collected a number of notes and sketches. He was in correspondence with all the most learned men of the day. His correspondence with President Bouhier was published in 1885 by Ernest Petit; his other letters have been edited by the Société des sciences historiques et naturelles de l'Yonne (2 vols., 1866–1867). He also wrote numerous articles, and, after his election as a member of the Académie des Inscriptions et Belles Lettres (1740), a number of Mémoires which appeared in the Recueil of this society. He died at Paris.

Lebeuf's most important researches had Paris as their subject. He published first a collection of Dissertations sur l'histoire civile et ecclésiastique de Paris (3 vols., 1739–1743), then an Histoire de la ville et de tout le diocèse de Paris (15 vols., 1745–1760), which is a mine of information, mostly taken from the original sources. In view of the advance made by scholarship in the 19th century, it was found necessary to publish a second edition. The work of reprinting it was undertaken by Hippolyte Cocheris, but was interrupted (1863) before the completion of vol. iv. Adrien Augier resumed the work, giving Lebeuf's text, though correcting the numerous typographical errors of the original edition (5 vols., 1883), and added a sixth volume containing an analytical table of contents. Finally, Fernand Bournon completed the work by a volume of Rectifications et additions (1890), worthy to appear side by side with the original work.

The bibliography of Lebeuf's writings is, partly, in various numbers of the Bibliothèque des écrivains de Bourgogne (1716–1741). His biography is given by Charles le Beau in the Histoire de l'Académie royale des Inscriptions (xxix., 372, published 1764), and by H. Cocheris, in the preface to his edition.

See also
Jublains archeological site, whose discovery was due in part to Lebeuf

References

18th-century French historians
Members of the Académie des Inscriptions et Belles-Lettres
1687 births
1760 deaths
French male non-fiction writers